Tiago Emanuel da Silva Miranda (born 5 January 1989), known professionally as Conan Osíris, is a Portuguese singer-songwriter. His stage name is based on the main character from Japanese series Future Boy Conan and the ancient Egyptian god Osiris.

Osíris gained national recognition after presenting his song "Telemóveis" at the 2019 Festival da Canção, the national selection show for the Eurovision Song Contest. After its release in online media, the song topped Portuguese trends in YouTube and Spotify. On 2 March 2019, Osíris won the Festival da Canção, securing the right to represent Portugal in the Eurovision Song Contest 2019 in Tel Aviv, Israel.

Personal life 
He was born in Lisbon and lived in Cacém for a few years while in high school. Today, he lives in Lisbon.

In 2010, he finished his degree in graphic design at the Polytechnic Institute of Castelo Branco. In the institute, he met Rúben de Sá Osório, who is his personal designer and dresser.

In 2012, he began working at the one of the stores of the well-known Portuguese sex shop chain, ContraNatura, in Lisbon.

In 2018, after the success of his second album "Adoro Bolos" he left his work at ContraNatura to work full time in his musical career.

Career 
He is a self-taught singer-songwriter and learnt his craft by trial and error while using the program FL Studio (Fruity Loops) on his computer.

He started his musical career in 2008 when he created the group Powny Lamb with Rita Moreira (also known professionally as Sreya). In 2011, they released their first and only EP, called "Cathedral" on SoundCloud.

He used the stage name Conan Osiris for first time on the track "Secluded" (created for Iuri's Fall/Winter 2013/2014 fashion show in ModaLisboa). He continued his work as a composer for fashion shows with "Evaporate" (Hibu, Spring/Summer 2014), "Pyres" (Gonçalo Pascoa, Spring/Summer 2014), "Triptych" (Valentim Quaresma, Fall/Winter 2014/2015) and "Selenographia" (Hibu, Fall/Winter 2014/2015). These five songs were later released in the 2014 EP, called "Silk", along with the songs "Remuneration" and "Amália", the first song where he sang in Portuguese, recorded with a SingStar microphone.

In 2016, he released his first album called "Música, Normal", about which he said: " Música normal (Normal music) is any music that can be absorbed by a living being. Normal music is the kind of music suited for whatever you want to do: to laugh, to cry, to dance, to travel, to take a shower…"

In 2017, he co-wrote and produced the album "Emocional", the first album by singer Sreya.

On the 30th of December 2017 he released his second album called "Adoro Bolos" on SoundCloud. This last album drew attention to him and he was invited by some Portuguese TV Shows to perform live, where he sang some of the most successful songs from the album such as "Adoro Bolos", "Celulitite", "Borrego" or "100 Paciência".

In 2018, he was invited by RTP to compose a song for Festival da Canção 2019. He wrote "Telemóveis" and decided to perform himself, On the 2nd of March, and after finishing second on the semi-final, Osiris won the show and represented Portugal in the Eurovision Song Contest 2019. However Osiris failed to qualify to the final, making it the first time since 2015 that Portugal had failed to qualify.

He performed at the Portuguese music festival Super Bock Super Rock 2019, at the Stage Somersby on 18 July,

Awards

Discography

Studio albums

Extended plays

Singles

As lead artist

References

1989 births
Living people
Eurovision Song Contest entrants for Portugal
Eurovision Song Contest entrants of 2019
21st-century Portuguese male singers
Musicians from Lisbon